The International Society for Intelligence Research (ISIR) is a scientific society for researchers in human intelligence. It was founded by Douglas K. Detterman of Case Western Reserve University in 2000. 

The society advocates for ongoing support for scientific research on cognitive ability. A 2018 New Statesman article called two editors of Intelligence "eugenicists" and that ISIR conferences have included speakers who are part of "the infiltration of mainstream academia by eugenicists".

The society runs the journal Intelligence.

Presidents 
The following persons are or have been president of the society:
2010 Douglas K. Detterman
2011 Earl B. Hunt
2012 Linda Gottfredson
2013 David Lubinski
2014 Aljoscha C. Neubauer
2015 Michael McDaniel
2016 Richard J. Haier
2017 Timothy Bates
2018 William Revelle
2019 Rex Jung

References

External links

International scientific organizations
Intelligence
Psychology organizations
Organizations established in 2000